Halbemond is a municipality in the district of Aurich, in Lower Saxony, Germany. It is home to the Motodrom Halbemond, one of Europe's largest speedway stadiums.

References

Towns and villages in East Frisia
Aurich (district)